The Little Rock Challenger is a professional tennis tournament played on hard courts. It is currently part of the ATP Challenger Tour. It is held annually in Little Rock, Arkansas, United States since 2019.

Past finals

Singles

Doubles

References

ATP Challenger Tour
Hard court tennis tournaments in the United States
Recurring sporting events established in 2019
Sports in Little Rock, Arkansas
Little Rock Challenger